NaCl (pronounced "salt") is an abbreviation for "Networking and Cryptography library", a public domain "...high-speed software library for network communication, encryption, decryption, signatures, etc".

NaCl was created by the mathematician and programmer Daniel J. Bernstein who is best known for the creation of qmail and Curve25519. The core team also includes Tanja Lange and Peter Schwabe. The main goal while creating NaCl, according to the paper, was to "avoid various types of cryptographic disasters suffered by previous cryptographic libraries".

Basic functions

Public-key cryptography 
 Signatures using Ed25519.
 Key agreement using X25519.

Secret-key cryptography 
 Authenticated encryption using Salsa20-Poly1305.
 Encryption using Salsa20 or AES.
 Authentication using HMAC-SHA-512-256.
 One-time authentication using Poly1305.

Low-level functions
 Hashing using SHA-512 or SHA-256 or BLAKE2 using libsodium

 String comparison.

Key derivation function (only libsodium) 
 Password hashing using argon2

Implementations 
Reference implementation is written in C, often with several inline assembler. C++ and Python are handled as wrappers.

NaCl has a variety of programming language bindings such as PHP, and forms the basis for Libsodium, a cross-platform cryptography library created in 2013 which is API compatible with NaCl.

Alternative implementations 
Libsodium — a portable, cross-compilable, installable, packageable, API-compatible version of NaCl.
dryoc — a pure-Rust implementation of libsodium/NaCl, with support for protected memory.
 NaCl Pharo — a Pharo Smalltalk Extension.
 TweetNaCl — a tiny C library, which fits in just 100 tweets (140 symbols each), but supports all NaCl functions.
 NaCl for Tcl — a port to the Tcl language.
 NaCl for JavaScript — a port of TweetNaCl/NaCl cryptographic library to the JavaScript language.
 TweetNaCl for Java — a port of TweetNaCl/NaCl cryptographic library to the Java language.
 SPARKNaCl — A re-write of TweetNaCl in the SPARK Ada subset, with formal and fully automatic proofs of type safety and some correctness properties.
 Crypt::NaCl::Sodium Perl 5 binding to libsodium

See also 
 Comparison of cryptography libraries
 List of free and open-source software packages

References

External links 
 

Public-domain software
Cryptographic software
2008 software